Monoedus is a genus of cylindrical bark beetles in the family Zopheridae. There are about eight described species in Monoedus.

Species
These eight species belong to the genus Monoedus:
 Monoedus grouvellei Dajoz, 1975
 Monoedus guttatus LeConte, 1882
 Monoedus hirtus Dajoz, 1975
 Monoedus horni Grouvelle, 1908
 Monoedus lecontei Fleutiaux & Sallé, 1889
 Monoedus obscurus Grouvelle, 1908
 Monoedus pubescens Dajoz, 1984
 Monoedus zonatus Grouvelle, 1908

References

Further reading

 
 
 

Zopheridae
Articles created by Qbugbot